Robert Wigley (15 March 1864 – 20 April 1926) was an Australian cricketer. He played in three first-class matches for South Australia between 1888 and 1890.

See also
 List of South Australian representative cricketers

References

External links
 

1864 births
1926 deaths
Australian cricketers
South Australia cricketers
Cricketers from Melbourne
People from Windsor, Victoria